Chinese patent medicine are herbal medicines in Traditional Chinese medicine, modernized into a ready-to-use form such as tablets, oral solutions or dry suspensions, as opposed to herbs that require cooking (hot water extraction).

Description

Chinese patent medicines generally consist of extracted condensed pills called teapills, and are usually small, spherical, and black. They are called teapills because the herbs are cooked into an herbal tea to make the pills. Honey or water pills made from ground raw herbs are also a popular format in China, and they tend to be larger and are slightly to significantly softer than teapills.

Modern teapills are created from herbs extracted in stainless steel extractors to create either a water decoction or water-alcohol decoction, depending on the herbs used. They are extracted at a low temperature (below 100 degrees Celsius; 212 degrees Fahrenheit) to preserve essential ingredients. The extracted liquid is then further condensed and a small amount of raw herb powder from one of the herbal ingredients is mixed in to form an herbal dough. This dough is then cut into tiny pieces by a machine, and a small amount of excipients are added for a smoother and a more consistent exterior. The products are then made as pills.

Honey pills and water pills have been made since ancient times by combining several dried herbs and other ingredients, which are grounded into powder, mixed with a binder and traditionally formed into pills by hand. Modern honey or water pills are formed into pills by machine. The binder is traditionally honey for honey pills. For water pills the binder may simply be water, or may include another binder, such as molasses. Modern manufacturers still produce many patent formulas as honey or water pills, such as Wuji Baifeng Wan, a popular honey pill formula to "nourish qi and blood", to strengthen the body.

Patents may come in other forms such as dripping pills, liquids, syrups, powders, granules, instant teas, and capsules.  Companies make Chinese patent medicines both within and outside China.

Like other patent medicines, they are not patented in the traditional sense of the word. No one has exclusive rights to the formula.  Instead, "patent" refers to the standardization of the formula.

In China, all Chinese patent medicines of the same name have the same proportions of ingredients, and are manufactured in accordance with the PRC Pharmacopoeia's monograph on that particular formula, which is mandated by Chinese law. Each monograph details the exact herbal ingredients that make up the patent formula, usually accompanied by the specific tests that should be used for correct herb identification, such as thin layer chromatography (TLC) or high performance liquid chromatography (HPLC), the percentage of each ingredient, and specific cautions and contraindications. The monograph also details the manufacturing methods that must be followed, how to process and cook the herbs, often including specific requirements for finished product testing including authenticating and assessing the potency of the formula with active ingredient markers where known, as well as testing for dissolution time and content uniformity. All good manufacturing practice (GMP) certified factories must also test for heavy metal levels and microbials for all patent medicines they produce.

However, many patents do not list all ingredients, presumably to protect the secrecy of the formula. An example of this is Yunnan Baiyao, a popular formula used to stop bleeding, whose ingredients have never been revealed. This is an acceptable practice in China, where no other protection exists to protect family or "secret" Chinese herbal formulas.

In western countries, there is considerable variation of ingredients and in the proportions of ingredients in products sharing the same name. This is because the Chinese government allows foreign companies to apply for modifications of patent formulas to be sold outside of China. For example, Hebei brand Lifei pills contain Kadsura (feng sha teng) and Morus (sang ye), whereas Plum Flower brand Li Fei Pian contains Schizandra (we wei zi) and Gecko (ge jie) instead.  Another example is Qing Qi Hua Tan Wan.  The Lanzou brand uses Citrus (ju hong).  The Lanzhou Foci Min Shan brand and the Plum Flower brand do not, but use Ginger (sheng jiang).

Herbal formulas

Chinese classic herbal formulas form the basis of Chinese patent medicine.  These are the basic herbal formulas that students of traditional Chinese medicine learn. Many of these formulas are quite old.  For example, "Liu Wei Di Huang Wan" (六味地黄丸 liù wèi dì huáng wán) was developed by Qian Yi  (钱乙 Qián Yǐ) (c. 1032–1113 CE).  It was published in the "Xiao'er Yao Zheng Zhi Jue" (also known as "Key to Therapeutics of Children's Diseases" 小儿药证直诀 xiǎoér yào zhèng zhí jué) in 1119 by Qian Yi's student. Although Liu Wei Di Huang Wan can be prepared as a raw herb decoction (or herbal tea), it was originally created to be made into honey pills. The last word in Liu Wei Di Huang Wan, "Wan" (丸) means "pill".

Criticisms

Heavy metal contamination
Some Chinese patent medicines were tested and found to contain high to dangerous levels of heavy metals.  The most common heavy metals found were mercury, lead, and arsenic.  These ingredients can cause serious medical problems.

Pharmaceutical adulterants
Some Chinese patent medicines were found to contain pharmaceutical drugs such as decongestants, analgesics or antihistamines.  The most common Chinese patent medicines found to carry pharmaceutical drugs were for the treatment of asthma, pain, and arthritis.

Many contaminants and drug adulterants named in the context of herbal medicine is intentionally added and declared on product labels. The mercury salt cinnabar, the arsenic salt realgar and the strychnine containing Strychnos nux-vomica  are used traditionally and kept in China despite the known harm and little proven benefit.

In the case of drugs, the entry for "Vitamin C/Lonicera/Forsythia tablet" in the Chinese Pharmacopoeia (ChP) calls for 105 mg of paracetamol and 1.05 mg of chlorpheniramine maleate each pill. Such a combination is common for Chinese cold medicine. In a more hidden case, the herb Ephedra naturally contains ephedrine and pseudoephedrine, and is required by the ChP to have more than 0.8% of the two decongestants (as hydrochloride salts) in its dry weight.

Prohibited ingredients
Some Chinese patent medicines contain ingredients which are banned in other countries.  The two most common prohibited herbs are Ephedra (麻黄 má huáng) (Ephedra) and Ban Xia (半夏 bàn xià) (Pinellia).  On 30 December 2003, the FDA in the US announced a ban (effective 12 April 2004), on these herbs from all dietary supplements.  Traditional Chinese herbal remedies are exempt from this law.

Regulation

In Taiwan
In modern-day Taiwan, regulations to address the criticisms are introduced due to Chinese patent medicines being prescription drugs since the 1970s and a part of the public health system since 1995.

Taiwan Herbal Pharmacopeia provides information on acceptable herbs in Taiwan.

Heavy metal contamination and pesticide residue
All Chinese patent medicine products sold in  aTaiwan must pass a heavy metal limitation test and pesticide residue test according to Taiwan Herbal Pharmacopeia. There are several manufacturers in Taiwan certified ISO 17025 Lab, for example: Sun-Ten, Chuang Song Zong Pharmaceutical Co., Ltd. (Chinese: 莊松榮)

Pharmaceutical adulterants
According to Taiwanese government law, products licenses will be suspended if there exists pharmaceutical adulterants. Furthermore, it could cause GMP certificate to be cancelled. In Taiwan, those main manufacturer in order to export products abroad, few of them has passed PIC/S GMP audition. For example: Sun-Ten, Chuang Song Zong Pharmaceutical Co., Ltd. (Chinese: 莊松榮).

In China 

As with more traditional formulae, standards for Chinese patent medicine are found in Volume 1 of Chinese Pharmacopoeia. Some of the resultant medications require a prescription to purchase, while others are considered over-the-counter drugs. Heavy metal limits are present for a few herbs, although they tend to be laxer than those defined for foods. As listed above, intentionally added heavy metals and drug adulterants are found in many products.

References

Fratkin, Jake (2001). Chinese Herbal Patent Medicines. Shya Publications. .
Taylor, Mark (1998). Chinese Patent Medicines: A Beginner's Guide. Global Eyes International Press. .
Taiwan herb pharmacopeia

See also
Kampo (Japanese adaptation of Chinese medicine)
Kampo list (list of Japanese versions of Chinese patent medicines)

Traditional Chinese medicine